This article presents a list of the historical events and publications of Australian literature during 1973.

Events 
 Patrick White is awarded the Nobel Prize in Literature, becoming the first, and so far only, Australian writer to be presented with the award.

Major publications

Books 
 Kit Denton – The Breaker : A Novel
 Hammond Innes – Golden Soak
 Morris Lurie – Rappaport's Revenge
 Christina Stead – The Little Hotel
 Morris West – The Salamander
 Patrick White – The Eye of the Storm

Short stories 
 Murray Bail – "Zoeliner's Definition"
 Elizabeth Jolley – "Another Holiday for the Prince"
 Frank Moorhouse
 "The Airport, the Pizzeria, the Motel, the Rented Car, and the Mysteries of Life"
 The Illegal Relatives
 Fay Zwicky – "Hostages"

Children's and Young Adult fiction 
 James Aldridge – A Sporting Proposition
 Mavis Thorpe Clark – Wildfire
 Max Fatchen – The Spirit Wind
 Elyne Mitchell – Silver Brumby Whirlwind
 Mary Elwyn Patchett – A Roar of the Lion
 Ivan Southall – Matt and Jo
 Eleanor Spence – Time to Go Home
 Colin Thiele – The Fire in the Stone
 Patricia Wrightson – The Nargun and the Stars

Poetry 

 Rosemary Dobson – Selected Poems
 A. D. Hope
 "Hay Fever"
 Selected Poems
 Roger McDonald – "Two Summers in Moravia"
 Peter Porter – Jonah
 Vivian Smith – "The Man Fern Near the Bus Stop"
 Judith Wright – Alice : Poems 1971-72

Drama 
 John Power – The Last of the Knucklemen

Awards and honours

Literary

Children and Young Adult

Poetry

Births 
A list, ordered by date of birth (and, if the date is either unspecified or repeated, ordered alphabetically by surname) of births in 1973 of Australian literary figures, authors of written works or literature-related individuals follows, including year of death.

 18 March  — Max Barry, novelist
 26 October — Chloe Hooper, author
 11 September — Cat Sparks, science fiction writer
 12 November — Jay Kristoff, fantasy and science fiction writer

Deaths 
A list, ordered by date of death (and, if the date is either unspecified or repeated, ordered alphabetically by surname) of deaths in 1973 of Australian literary figures, authors of written works or literature-related individuals follows, including year of birth.

 20 April – Michael Dransfield, poet (born 1948)
 23 November – Francis Webb, poet (born 1925)

See also 
 1973 in literature
 1973 in poetry
 List of years in literature
 List of years in Australian literature
 1973 in literature
1972 in Australian literature
1973 in Australia
1974 in Australian literature

References

 
Australian literature by year
20th-century Australian literature
1973 in literature